Events in the year 2023 in Gabon.

Incumbents 

 President: Ali Bongo Ondimba
 Prime Minister: Rose Christiane Ossouka Raponda (until 9 January); Alain Claude Bilie By Nze onwards

Events 
Ongoing: COVID-19 pandemic in Gabon

 9 January – Gabonese president Ali Bongo Ondimba names Alain Claude Bilie By Nze as the new prime minister and head of government, replacing Rose Christiane Raponda after Ondimba issued a presidential decree.

Scheduled 

 2023 Gabonese general election

Deaths 
 10 January – Alain da Costa, 87, football manager (USM Libreville, Vantour Mangoungou, national team).
 20 January – Michael Moussa Adamo, 62, politician, minister of foreign affairs (since 2022).

References 

 
2020s in Gabon
Years of the 21st century in Gabon
Gabon